The Heart on the Rhine (German: Das Herz am Rhein) is a 1925 German silent film directed by Heinrich Lisson and starring Camilla Spira.

The film's sets were designed by the art director Jacek Rotmil.

Cast
 Heinz Ludwig as Schneider Fips 
 Albert Maurer as Maler Andreas 
 Hertha Müller as Tochter Bärbel 
 Mizzi Schütz as Mutter Pummel 
 Camilla Spira
 Gustav Zeitzschel

References

Bibliography
 Parish, Robert. Film Actors Guide. Scarecrow Press, 1977.

External links

1925 films
Films of the Weimar Republic
Films directed by Heinrich Lisson
German silent feature films
German black-and-white films